Thea Hjelmeland (born 1987 in Førde, Sogn og Fjordane) is a Norwegian musician, singer and songwriter, raised by an artist mother and a musician father.

Career 
Her first album Oh, the third.. was released in 2012.

Her second album Solar Plexus was released in 2014. The music is a mixture of pop, electronica and world music. The album received good to excellent reviews. The song "Feathery" was released as a single.

Hjelmeland has featured on several of Lars Vaular's songs. In 2014, she made the music for Frode Grytten's play Sånne som oss at Den Nationale Scene. The play was based on the songs of John Olav Nilsen & Gjengen.

She lives in Bergen and has also lived in Førde, Cuba and Paris.

Honors 
2014: Spellemannprisen awarded in the class Indie pop
2015: Vossajazzprisen

Discography 
2012: Oh, The Third.. (Øra Fonogram)
2014: Solar Plexus (TheaH Music)

References 

Spellemannprisen winners
Living people
Norwegian singer-songwriters
Norwegian pop musicians
English-language singers from Norway
1987 births
People from Førde
21st-century Norwegian singers
21st-century Norwegian women singers